Enneapterygius rhothion, the New Caledonian blackhead surf triplefin or surf triplefin, is a species of triplefin blenny in the genus Enneapterygius. It was described by Ronald Fricke in 1997. This species occurs in New Caledonia and Vanuatu.

References

rhothion
Fish described in 1997